John Lunan (died 1838) was a planter and magistrate in Jamaica. He was elected to the House of Assembly of Jamaica in 1820.

References 

Members of the House of Assembly of Jamaica
Planters from the British West Indies
Year of birth unknown
1838 deaths